Planking may refer to:

 Planking (fad), an activity consisting of lying face down—sometimes in an unusual or incongruous location
 Plank (exercise), an isometric core strength exercise
 Planking, a form of indirect grilling
 Shad Planking, an annual political event in Virginia
 Types of boat construction, see boat building

See also
 Plank (disambiguation)